The 2009 JB Group Classic is a women's exhibition (no points for the world ranking can be earned) team tennis tournament organized at the beginning of each season. Unlike previous years, the tournament is played in a round robin format.

Players

Team Americas
 Venus Williams
 Gisela Dulko
 Coco Vandeweghe

Team Russia
 Vera Zvonareva
 Anna Chakvetadze
 Alexandra Panova

Team Asia Pacific
 Zheng Jie
 Sania Mirza
 Zhang Ling

Team Europe
 Jelena Janković
 Ágnes Szávay
 Michelle Larcher de Brito

Results

Semi-finals

Team Europe vs. Team Americas

Team Asia Pacific vs. Team Russia

Silver Group Finals

Team Europe vs. Team Asia Pacific

Gold Group Finals

Team Americas vs. Team Russia

External links
Official website

JB Group Classic
Tennis tournaments in Hong Kong
2009 in Hong Kong sport
2009 in Chinese tennis
2009 in Hong Kong women's sport